KVZ Sports Club is a Tanzanian / Zanzibarian football club.

The team competes in the Zanzibar Premier League.

They competed in the CAF Confederation Cup for the first time in 2017.

Achievements 
Zanzibar Premier League: 0

Performance in CAF competitions 
CAF Confederation Cup: 1 appearance
2017 – Preliminary Round

References 

Football clubs in Tanzania
Zanzibari football clubs